Helen Hughes may refer to:

 Helen Hughes (economist) (1928–2013), Australian economist
 Helen Hughes (actress) (1918–2018), American-Canadian actress
 Helen Hughes (scientist) (born 1929), New Zealand botanist
 Helen MacGill Hughes (1903–1992), Canadian sociologist and feminist
 Helen Slayton-Hughes (1930–2022), American actress
 Helen Hughes (EastEnders)